Amalner Assembly constituency is one of the 288 Vidhan Sabha constituencies of Maharashtra state in western India. This constituency is located in the Jalgaon district.

It is part of the Jalgaon Lok Sabha constituency along with another five Vidhan Sabha segments of this district, namely Jalgaon City, Jalgaon Rural, Erandol, Chalisgaon and Pachora.

Members of Legislative Assembly
 1951: PATIL, NAMDEO YADAV Indian National Congress
 1962: SHAHJAHANKHAN JALAMKHAN TADVI Indian National Congress
 1967: K. M. PATIL Indian National Congress
 1972: JAGATRAO VYANKATRAO PAWAR Indian National Congress
 1978: GULABRAO WAMANRAO PATIL Janata Party
 1980: GULABRAO WAMANRAO PATIL Janata Party
 1985: AMRUTRAO VAMANRAO PATIL Indian National Congress
 1990: PATIL GULABRAO WAMANRAO Janata Dal
 1995: ABASAHEB DR B S PATIL Bharatiya Janata Party
 1999: ABASAHEB DR B S PATIL Bharatiya Janata Party
 2004: ABASAHEB DR B S PATIL Bharatiya Janata Party
 2009: Krushibhushan Sahebrao Dhondu Patil, Independent candidate
 2014: Shirish Hiralal Chaudhari, Independent candidate
 2019: Anil Bhaidas Patil, Nationalist Congress Party

Election Results

2019

See also
 Amalner
 List of constituencies of Maharashtra Vidhan Sabha

References

Assembly constituencies of Maharashtra